James Whitney Dunn (born July 21, 1943) is an American politician and businessman from the Michigan. He served in the U.S. House of Representatives from 1981 to 1983 before unsuccessfully seeking reelection. He ran for the Senate in 1988, but was defeated by Democratic incumbent Donald W. Riegle, Jr. He sought another term in the U.S. House in 1990, but lost in the Republican primary to Dave Camp.

Biography

Dunn was born in Detroit, Michigan and attended the public schools. He received a B.A. from Michigan State University in 1967.  He was president, Dunn & Fairmont, builder and developer. He was a delegate to the Michigan State Republican convention in 1982.

In 1980, Dunn defeated incumbent Democrat Bob Carr to be elected as a Republican from Michigan's 6th congressional district to the 97th Congress, serving from January 3, 1981 to January 3, 1983. In 1982, he was an unsuccessful candidate for reelection, losing in the general election to Carr. In 1984, Dunn made an unsuccessful run for the U.S. Senate seat held by Democrat Carl Levin, losing in the Republican primary to Jack R. Lousma. In 1986, he ran for the 6th district seat, and again lost in the general election to Bob Carr. In 1988, he won the Republican nomination to the U.S. Senate, having defeated former U.S. Representative Robert J. Huber, who had left office in 1975. Dunn then lost the general election to the Democrat Donald W. Riegle, Jr. In 1990, he ran for the U.S. House again, this time from the 10th district, but he lost the Republican primary to Dave Camp.

He is a resident of East Lansing, Michigan.

References

The Political Graveyard

1943 births
Living people
Michigan State University alumni
Politicians from Detroit
Republican Party members of the United States House of Representatives from Michigan